Stefan Svensson is a retired Swedish footballer. Svensson made seven Allsvenskan appearances for Djurgården and scored no goals.

References

Swedish footballers
Djurgårdens IF Fotboll players
Association footballers not categorized by position